Brendan Fletcher (born December 15, 1981) is a Canadian actor. He first gained recognition as a child actor, being nominated for a Gemini Award for his acting debut in the made-for-television film Little Criminals and winning a Leo Award for his role in the TV series Caitlin's Way. He subsequently won the Genie Award for Best Leading Actor for John Greyson’s The Law of Enclosures, and was nominated for Best Actor in a Supporting Role for Turning Paige.

Fletcher is known for playing troubled, eccentric, or unhinged characters, and is considered a character actor. He has appeared in high-profile films like Tideland, Freddy vs. Jason, Citizen Gangster, The Revenant and Violent Night. He had the leading role in Uwe Boll’s Rampage trilogy, playing mass murderer Bill Williamson. He has also appeared in television series such as Smallville, Supernatural, The Pacific, Rogue, Hell on Wheels, Siren, Arrow, and Superman & Lois.

Life and career
Fletcher was born in Comox Valley, British Columbia, and went to junior high school at Lake Trail in Courtenay, British Columbia.

His acting debut was in 1995 in the CBC television movie Little Criminals, earning him a Gemini Award nomination. His filmography includes Tideland, Freddy vs. Jason, Ginger Snaps 2: Unleashed, Ginger Snaps Back: The Beginning,  The Five Senses, Air Bud, Rampage 1-3, Eighteen, and Law of Enclosures. He also played Stirling Patterson (nickname: Stink) in The Adventures of Shirley Holmes, appeared as Eric Anderson in Caitlin's Way and as Max in the Supernatural episode "Nightmare" and he appeared in the season 8 episode "Injustice" of Smallville as Rudy Jones aka The Parasite. He portrayed PFC Bill Leyden in the HBO miniseries The Pacific, which received a number of prestigious accolades including a Peabody Award and eight Primetime Emmys.

Fletcher has made a number of collaborations with director Uwe Boll starting with his 2002 film Heart of America, and portraying mass murderer Bill Williamson in the director's controversial Rampage trilogy. He had a recurring guest role on the Western drama series Hell on Wheels, and appeared in a supporting role on the crime drama Cardinal. He appeared in the critically lauded 2015 Western film The Revenant alongside Leonardo DiCaprio and Tom Hardy.

Fletcher has received numerous accolades for his work, having received a total of 4 Gemini Award nominations, 4 Leo Award nominations, and 2 Genie Award nominations. He has won 2 Geminis, 1 Leo, and 1 Genie.

In September 2018, Fletcher portrayed Stanley Dover in the seventh season of Arrow.

Personal life
Fletcher resides in Vancouver, British Columbia, and is a supporter of the Vancouver Canucks. He is in a relationship with actress Sara Thompson.

Filmography

Film

Television

Awards and nominations

References

External links
 

1981 births
Living people
Male actors from British Columbia
Canadian male film actors
Canadian male television actors
People from the Comox Valley Regional District
Best Actor Genie and Canadian Screen Award winners